Amrutharamam is a 2020 Indian Telugu-language romance film written and directed by Surender Kontaddi, starring Ram Mittakanti and Amitha Ranganath. The film has music composed by NS Prasu. It was the first Telugu film to have a direct-to-OTT release. The plot revolves around an NRI couple in Australia who fall for each other. Released on ZEE5, the film received a lukewarm response from the audience.

Plot

Cast  
Ram Mittakanti as Ram
Amitha Ranganath as Amrutha

Production and release 
The entire film was shot in New South Wales, Australia.

The film was initially scheduled for a theatrical release on 25 March 2020, but was postponed due to the COVID-19 pandemic. On 29 April 2020, the film was released directly on ZEE5.

Reception 
The Times of India rated the film 2/5 and termed the film as "[an] overdose of melodrama." On the debutant actors, the review added that "The performances are not impressive and both the leads fail to make a mark." The Hindu's Sangeetha Devi Dundoo opined that "The plot of Amrutharamam feels outdated." and "tries too hard to be a saga of eternal love" A reviewer from Sakshi wrote that the screenplay of the film offers nothing new.

References

External links 

2020 romance films
Indian romance films
Films postponed due to the COVID-19 pandemic
2020 direct-to-video films
Films shot in New South Wales
Films set in New South Wales
ZEE5 original films